Bellah is a surname. Notable people with the surname include:

James Warner Bellah (1899–1976), pulp fiction writer
Robert N. Bellah (1927–2013), American sociologist
Ross Bellah (1907–2004), American art director
Sam Bellah (1887–1963), American athlete

See also

NB: a surname for people who lived in farms. e.g. Johnson Bellah Brian Bellah Susan R Bellah